Du Yu (杜宇) is a Chinese composer. He was involved in co-composition of many of the most famous Chinese-language western-style operas prior to the Cultural Revolution.

Works
 Chen Zi and Du Yu (composer): Chun lei Spring thunder
 Zhang Dinghe and Du Yu: Doushi ting The poem contest pavilion
 Chen Zi and Du Yu: Dou E Yuan The grievances of Dou E, also known as Snow in Summer
 Du Yu (composer): The Gada plum blossoms Gada meilin
 Du Yu (composer): A busy country scene Ren huan ma jiao

References

Living people
People's Republic of China composers
Chinese male classical composers
Chinese classical composers
Chinese opera composers
Male opera composers
Year of birth missing (living people)